Raghavan Iyer (born 1961) is an Indian American chef.

Iyer was born in Mumbai and moved to the United States in 1982 to study hospitality at Southwest Minnesota State University. After using his background as a French teacher to find work in the field, he eventually became a chef and cookbook writer. His first successful book, published in 2001, was Betty Crocker's Indian Home Cooking, an introduction to Indian food aimed at Americans with limited previous experience with it. The Betty Crocker book was the first of a number of popular cookbooks on the subject; as the New York Times reported, he "has by some estimations taught more Americans how to cook Indian food than anyone else." In 2016, he won a James Beard Foundation Award for his video series Indian Curries: The Basics and Beyond. His final major project is a crowdfunded enterprise called The Revival Foods Project: Global Comforts That Heal.

Personal life
Iyer met his future partner, Terry Erickson, on his first day in Minnesota; he and Erickson raised a son together. In his late 50s Iyer was diagnosed with colorectal cancer, and decided to go public with the news to encourage others to get screened. After five years of fighting the disease, he disclosed that it had metastasized to his brain and lungs and he did not expect to survive.

Works

References

1961 births
Chefs of Indian cuisine
Chefs from Minnesota
James Beard Foundation Award winners
Indian gay writers
Living people